West Pottsgrove Township is a township in Montgomery County, Pennsylvania, United States. The population was 3,874 at the 2010 census.

Geography
It is drained by the Schuylkill River, which separates it from Chester County. Its villages include Stowe and Upper Glasgow.

Neighboring municipalities
Upper Pottsgrove Township (northeast)
Pottstown (southeast)
North Coventry Township, Chester County (south)
Union Township, Berks County (tangent to the southwest)
Douglass Township, Berks County (northwest)

Transportation

U.S. Route 422 is the main highway serving West Pottsgrove Township, traversing the southern corner of the township on an east-west alignment. A small section of Pennsylvania Route 100 crosses the eastern corner of the township.

Pottstown Area Rapid Transit (PART) provides bus service to West Pottsgrove Township with the Green and Orange lines providing service to Pottstown. The Green Line serves Stowe while the Green and Orange lines serve the Upland Square shopping center.

Demographics

As of the 2010 census, the township was 83.7% White, 9.5% Black or African American, 0.3% Native American, 0.6% Asian, and 2.9% were two or more races. 3.3% of the population were of Hispanic or Latino ancestry.

At the 2000 census there were 3,815 people, 1,524 households, and 1,010 families living in the township.  The population density was 1,622.0 people per square mile (626.8/km2).  There were 1,606 housing units at an average density of 682.8/sq mi (263.9/km2).  The racial makeup of the township was 89.28% White, 7.21% African American, 0.18% Native American, 0.84% Asian, 0.03% Pacific Islander, 0.81% from other races, and 1.65% from two or more races. Hispanic or Latino of any race were 2.18%.

There were 1,524 households, 29.9% had children under the age of 18 living with them, 52.2% were married couples living together, 10.7% had a female householder with no husband present, and 33.7% were non-families. 27.2% of households were made up of individuals, and 9.6% were one person aged 65 or older.  The average household size was 2.50 and the average family size was 3.08.

The age distribution was 24.6% under the age of 18, 7.7% from 18 to 24, 32.3% from 25 to 44, 22.0% from 45 to 64, and 13.5% 65 or older.  The median age was 36 years. For every 100 females there were 92.9 males.  For every 100 females age 18 and over, there were 91.7 males.

The median household income was $42,759 and the median family income  was $52,177. Males had a median income of $32,912 versus $28,949 for females. The per capita income for the township was $18,413.  About 5.8% of families and 7.7% of the population were below the poverty line, including 8.7% of those under age 18 and 7.3% of those age 65 or over.

Government and politics

West Pottsgrove Township is governed by a five-member Board of Commissioners. As of 2022, the Board of Commissioners is composed of:
President Steve Miller
Vice President Tom Palladino
Charlie Valentine
Pete La Rosa
Mark Green

References

External links

Official website

Townships in Montgomery County, Pennsylvania